Abdulmejid II (29 May 1868 – 23 August 1944) was the last Caliph of the Ottoman Dynasty, the only Caliph of the Republic of Turkey, and nominally the 37th Head of the Ottoman Imperial House from 1922 to 1944.

Biography

Early years
On 30 May 1868, he was born at Dolmabahçe Palace, Beşiktaş, Istanbul, to then Sultan Abdulaziz and his wife Hayranidil Kadın. He was the younger full brother of Nazime Sultan.  He was educated privately.

In accordance with late Ottoman custom, Abdulmejid was confined to the palace until he was 40. On 4 July 1918, his first cousin Mehmed VI became Sultan and Abdulmejid was named Crown Prince. When his cousin was deposed on 1 November 1922, the Ottoman Sultanate was abolished. But on 19 November 1922, the Crown Prince was elected Caliph by the Turkish National Assembly at Ankara. He established himself in Istanbul on 24 November 1922.

On 3 March 1924, six months after the foundation of the Turkish Republic, the Ottoman Caliphate was abolished and the Ottoman dynasty was deposed and expelled from Turkey.

As artist
Abdulmejid was given the title of General in the Ottoman Army, but did not have strong military inclinations. He had a more significant role as Chairman of the Ottoman Artists' Society.

He is considered one of the most important painters of late period Ottoman art. His paintings of the Harem, showing a modern musical gathering, and of his wife, Şehsuvar Hanım, reading Goethe's novel Faust, express the influence of western Europe in his elite circle. These were displayed at a 1918 exhibition of Ottoman paintings in Vienna. His personal self-portrait can be seen at Istanbul Modern.

Abdulmejid was also an avid collector of butterflies, an activity that he pursued during the last 20 years of his life. His favourite magazine was Revue des deux Mondes.

Paintings

Personal life
Abdülmecid's first wife was Şehsuvar Hanım, a Turk  or an Ubykh. They married on 23 December 1896. She was the mother of Şehzade Ömer Faruk, born in 1898. She died in Paris in 1945, and was buried in Bobigny cemetery. His second wife was Mihrimah Hanım. She died at the Nakkaştepe Palace, on 23 May 1899, and was buried in Nuhkuyusu Mosque, Istanbul.

His third wife was Hayrünissa Hanım, a Circassian. She was childless. His fourth wife was Mehisti Hanım. She was a Circassian-Abkhazian. Her father was Akalsba Hacımaf Bey, and her mother was Safiye Hanım. They married on 16 April 1912. She was the mother of Dürrüşehvar Sultan (who married Azam Jah, son of Mir Osman Ali Khan), born in 1914. She died in Middlesex, London in 1964, and was buried in Brookwood cemetery.

Life in exile and death
The caliph was nominally the supreme religious and political leader of all Muslims across the world, with the main goal to prevent extremism or protect the religion from corruption. In the last session of the budget negotiations on 3 March 1924, Urfa Deputy Sheikh Saffet Efendi and his 53 friends demanded the abolition of the caliphate, arguing it was not necessary anymore. This was approved by majority of the votes and a law was established. With the same law, it was decided to expel all members of the Ottoman dynasty. Mustafa Kemal Atatürk, however, offered the caliphate to Ahmed Sharif as-Senussi, on the condition that he reside outside Turkey; Senussi declined the offer and confirmed his support for Abdulmejid.

Although Abdülmecid and his family were upset about this decision, they did not want the people to revolt, so they secretly went to Çatalca by car from the Dolmabahçe Palace at 5:00 the next morning. Here, after being hosted by the head of the Rumeli Railways Company for a while, they were put on the Simplon Express.

When Abdulmejid II arrived in Switzerland, he was detained at the border for a while, but was admitted to the country after a delay. In Switzerland, he said multiple times that he was upset about the abolition of the caliphate, and that this would bring chaos to the Islamic world, with the rise of extremism. But after the Turkish government put pressure on the Swiss government, Abdulmejid was never allowed to give such speeches in Switzerland again. After staying in Switzerland for a while, he moved to Nice, France in October 1924.

Abdulmejid lived a quiet life in Nice, France. At first he was poor, hungry, and almost homeless. His daughter Dürrüşehvar Sultan and his niece Nilüfer Hanım Sultan married the sons of the Nizam of Hyderabad, one of the richest people in the world; thanks to this, his financial situation improved. As he did not seek to restore the caliphate from the Islamic world, he became depressed and focused more on worship, painting and music.

Abdulmejid, who later settled in Paris, used to perform Friday prayers at the Grand Mosque of Paris with other Muslims in the region. After the departure of his very fond grandchildren and son, who left France to marry the Kavala princes of Egypt, he spent painful days alone. He wrote a 12-volume book of memoirs, preserved by his daughter Dürrüşehvar Sultan.

On 23 August 1944, Abdulmejid II died at his house in the 15th Avenue du Maréchal Mounoury, Paris, due to a heart attack. His death coincided with the Liberation of Paris from the German occupation. Despite the efforts of Dürrüşehvar Sultan, the Turkish government did not permit his funeral to be held in Turkey. Subsequently, his remains were preserved at the Grand Mosque of Paris for ten years. Finally, when the mosque could no longer maintain his body, his remains were transferred to Medina where he was buried in the special Al-Baqi' cemetery due to him being a caliph.

Honours
Ottoman honours 
 Order of House of Osman, Jeweled
 Order of Glory, Jeweled
 Imtiyaz Medal, Jeweled
 Order of Osmanieh, Jeweled
 Order of the Medjidie, Jeweled
 Iftikhar Sanayi Medal
 Imtiyaz War Medal in Gold
 Outstanding Navy Medal in Gold

Foreign honours 
: Grand-Cross Order of Leopold, 6 June 1918
: Order of the Crown, 2nd Class, 23 August 1919

Family

Consorts
Abdülmejid II had four consorts:
 Şehsuvar Kadın (2 May 1881-1945). They married on 22 December 1896 and had a son. 
 Hayrünissa Kadın (2 March 1876-3 September 1936). She was born in Bandirma, Turkey. They married on 18 June 1902 in Ortakoy Palace. She died in Nice. 
 Mihrimah Bihruz Kadın (24 May 1903-1955). She was born in İzmit. They married on 21 March 1912 in Çamlıca Palace. She died in Istanbul. 
 Atiye Mehisti Kadın (27 January 1892-1964). She was born in Adapadari. They married on 16 April 1912 in Çamlıca Palace and had a daughter. She died in London.

Issue
Abdülmejid II had a son and a daughter:
 Şehzade Ömer Faruk (27 February 1898-28 March 1969) - with Şehsuvar Kadın. Married twice and had three daughters. 
 Hatice Hayriye Ayşe Dürrüşehvar Sultan (26 January 1914-7 February 2006) - with Mehisti Kadın. She married once and had two sons.

See also
 Line of succession to the former Ottoman throne

References

Bibliography

External links

 

1868 births
1944 deaths
19th-century people from the Ottoman Empire
20th-century caliphs
Exiles from the Ottoman Empire
20th-century painters from the Ottoman Empire
Turks from the Ottoman Empire
People from Beşiktaş
Turkish Muslims
Turkish expatriates in France
Heads of the Osmanoğlu family
Heirs apparent who never acceded
Burials at Jannat al-Baqī